John Duffy may refer to:

Sportspeople
 John Duffy (footballer, born 1886) (1886–?), English football centre half for Bradford City
 John Duffy (footballer, born 1922) (1922–1996), Scottish football right back for Clyde and Norwich
 John Duffy (footballer, born 1929) (1929–2004), Scottish football wing half for Celtic, Arbroath and Southend
 John Duffy (footballer, born 1943), Scottish football wing half for Raith, Dunfermline, Darlington and Australian clubs
 John Duffy (Gaelic footballer), Gaelic football player
 John Duffy (rugby league) (born 1980), rugby league player
 John Duffy (soccer) (1905–1984), American soccer player

Others
 John Duffy (composer) (1926–2015), American composer
 John Duffy (economist) (born 1964), American economist
 John Duffy (mobster) (died 1924), American gang member, member of the North Side Gang
 John Duffy (writer), Canadian writer and political strategist
 John Duffy and David Mulcahy (both born 1959), the Railway Rapists, British rapists and murderers
 John A. Duffy (1884–1944), American bishop
 John F. Duffy (born 1963), legal academic
 John Gavan Duffy (1844–1917), Australian politician
 John J. Duffy, American Medal of Honor recipient
 John J. Duffy Jr. (1933–2019), American criminal defense attorney
 John Duffy (medical historian) (1915–1996), author of several medical history books

See also
 Jack Duffy (actor) (1882–1939), American film actor
 Jack Duffy (1926–2008), Canadian entertainer